Jonas Johansson (born March 29, 1982) is a Swedish former professional ice hockey defenceman.

Between 2001 and 2006, Johansson played in the Swedish Elitserien with Luleå HF.

References

External links

1982 births
Living people
Luleå HF players
Swedish ice hockey defencemen
People from Luleå
Sportspeople from Norrbotten County